Mount Vision is a peak in the volcanic complex 1 nautical mile (1.9 km) northwest of Mount Aurora on Black Island. So named by the New Zealand Geological Survey Antarctic Expedition (NZGSAE) (1958–59) because of the magnificent view obtained of the peaks in this vicinity and of the Ross Archipelago and Minna Bluff area.

Volcanoes of the Ross Dependency
Black Island (Ross Archipelago)